Aauri Lorena Bokesa Abia (born 14 December 1988 in Madrid) is a Spanish sprinter who specializes in the 400 metres. She represented Spain at the 2012 Summer Olympics where she was 6th in Round 1 with a time of 53.67. At the 2016 Olympics, she was 6th again in her first round heat, in a time of 53.51.  Bokesa also plays basketball for the women's counterpart of CB Estudiantes.

Competition record

Personal life
Bokesa's parents are from Basacato del Este, Bioko Norte Province, Equatorial Guinea.

References

External links
 
 
 
 
 

1988 births
Living people
Spanish female sprinters
Spanish women's basketball players
Olympic female sprinters
Olympic athletes of Spain
Athletes (track and field) at the 2012 Summer Olympics
Athletes (track and field) at the 2016 Summer Olympics
Athletes (track and field) at the 2020 Summer Olympics
World Athletics Championships athletes for Spain
Mediterranean Games bronze medalists for Spain
Mediterranean Games medalists in athletics
Athletes (track and field) at the 2018 Mediterranean Games
Spanish Athletics Championships winners
Competitors at the 2011 Summer Universiade
Athletes from Madrid
Basketball players from Madrid
Spanish people of Bubi descent
Spanish sportspeople of Equatoguinean descent